005 is a Sega video game from 1981.

OO5, 005, 0O5, or O05 may also refer to:

 O05, Rogers Field airport
 0O5, University Airport
 "005", a fictional British secret service agent, see 00 Agent
 Lufthansa Flight 005, a scheduled flight en route from Frankfurt to Bremen